Rodrigo Longo Freitas (born 13 March 1993), commonly known as Digão, is a Brazilian footballer who most recently played as a right back for Adanaspor.

Club career
Born in Rio de Janeiro, Digão joined Flamengo's youth setup in 2001, aged only eight. In 2011, after Rafael Galhardo's call-up to Brazil under-20s, he was promoted to the main squad by manager Vanderlei Luxemburgo and acted mainly as a backup to Léo Moura.

Digão made his senior debut on 21 January 2012, in a 4–0 Campeonato Carioca home routing of Bonsucesso. On 18 June of the following year he renewed his contract, signing until the end of 2014.

On 27 June 2014, after being rarely used, Digão was loaned to América-RN until the end of the year. He made no appearances for the side, and was subsequently released by his parent club when his loan expired.

In October 2015 Digão moved to Volta Redonda. On 1 December of that year he joined Portuguesa.

References

External links

1993 births
Living people
Footballers from Rio de Janeiro (city)
Brazilian footballers
Association football defenders
Campeonato Brasileiro Série A players
TFF First League players
CR Flamengo footballers
América Futebol Clube (RN) players
Volta Redonda FC players
Associação Portuguesa de Desportos players
Adanaspor footballers
Brazilian expatriate footballers
Brazilian expatriate sportspeople in Turkey
Expatriate footballers in Turkey